The Lučivná Tunnel is a short covered tunnel in northern Slovakia, on the D1 motorway between Štrba and Mengusovce. Its construction started in 2005 and was open in 2007. Its purpose is to provide a safe crossing for wild animals.

Road tunnels in Slovakia